The 2021 Dutch Grand Prix (officially known as the Formula 1 Heineken Dutch Grand Prix 2021) was a Formula One motor race held on 5 September 2021 at the Circuit Zandvoort. It was the thirteenth round of the 2021 Formula One World Championship and the first Dutch Grand Prix to take place since 1985. The race was won by Max Verstappen – prior to him, no Dutch driver had won their home race.

Background 

The event, which was held over the weekend of 3–5 September at the Circuit Zandvoort, was the thirteenth round of the 2021 World Championship. The race took place one week after the Belgian Grand Prix and precedes the Italian Grand Prix. The race was also championship contender, Max Verstappen's home Grand Prix.

Track layout 

Championship standings before the race 
After the Belgian Grand Prix handed out half-points due to heavy rainfall, Lewis Hamilton's championship lead was reduced to just three points to Verstappen in second. For the second race in a row, Lando Norris, Valtteri Bottas and Sergio Pérez all scored no points, meaning they stayed third, fourth and fifth respectively. Mercedes also led the Constructors' Championship by 7 points to Red Bull. McLaren regained third place after Daniel Ricciardo scored six points. Ferrari trailed McLaren by 3.5 points and Alpine sat in fifth place.

Entrants 

The drivers and teams were initially the same as the season entry list with no additional stand-in drivers for the race.

Before the third practice session, Alfa Romeo Racing driver Kimi Räikkönen tested positive for coronavirus. He was replaced by the reserve driver Robert Kubica, who last raced at the 2019 Abu Dhabi Grand Prix, driving for Williams.

Williams team principal Jost Capito also had to go into isolation following a dinner with Räikkönen the night before.

Tyre choices 
Sole tyre supplier Pirelli allocated the C1, C2, and C3 compounds of tyre to be used in the race.

Practice 
Free practice 1 took place at 11:30 CEST on 3 September, while free practice 2 took place at 15:00 CEST on the same day. Free practice 3 took place at 12:00 CEST on 4 September. All three practice sessions lasted for one hour.

The first session ended with Lewis Hamilton fastest for Mercedes ahead of Red Bull's Max Verstappen and Ferrari's Carlos Sainz Jr. The session was red flagged for 35 minutes after an engine failure of Aston Martin's Sebastian Vettel.

The second session ended with Charles Leclerc fastest for Ferrari ahead of his teammate Carlos Sainz Jr. and Alpine's Esteban Ocon. The session was red flagged for nine minutes after a loss of power for Mercedes driver Lewis Hamilton. The session was also red flagged for Haas's Nikita Mazepin after he spun into a gravel trap. Verstappen was investigated by the stewards for overtaking another driver during the first red flag period of the session, though the stewards ultimately decided a penalty was not necessary.

Qualifying 
Qualifying took place at 15:00 CEST on 4 September.

Qualifying classification 

  – Nicholas Latifi received a five-place grid penalty for an unscheduled gearbox change. He was then required to start the race from the pit lane for a front wing change and nose assembly in parc fermé.
  – Sergio Pérez was required to start the race from the back of the grid for exceeding his quota of power unit elements. He was then required to start the race from the pit lane for a new energy store specification.

Race 
The race started at 15:00 CEST on 5 September.

Race classification 

 Notes
  – Includes one point for fastest lap.
  – George Russell was classified as he completed more than 90% of the race distance.

Championship standings after the race

Drivers' Championship standings

Constructors' Championship standings

 Note: Only the top five positions are included for both sets of standings.

See also 
 2021 Zandvoort FIA Formula 3 round
 2021 W Series Zandvoort round

Notes

References

External links 

Dutch
Dutch Grand Prix
Dutch Grand Prix
Dutch Grand Prix